The Ho Chi Minh City Metro (HCMC Metro) is a planned rapid transit network that will serve Ho Chi Minh City in Vietnam. 

Its first metro line, Line 1, started construction in 2012 and is scheduled for completion in late 2023, with operations starting in 2024. As of 2021, most of the network is in the planning stages, with projects for different lines advancing as funds become available.

History

Earlier proposals (2001–2012) 
The network was first proposed in 2001 as part of a comprehensive public transport network plan including Ho Chi Minh City and neighbouring provinces, with the aim of avoiding the severe traffic congestion problems that have affected other Asian cities (such as Hanoi).

According to the original master plan submitted in February 2001, the metro system would comprise six lines. The plan was originally expected to cost US$1.5 billion over 10 years, as part of a US$3.35 billion program to build a rail network serving Ho Chi Minh City and surrounding provinces.

The plan was revised in 2007 and proposed no less than six urban rail lines. Bến Thành Market in District 1, already a major hub for bus traffic, will become a major hub connecting several lines.

Revised plan and construction (2013–present) 

The latest plans for Ho Chi Minh City Metro, a revised version of the earlier proposal in 2007, was approved on 8 April 2013.
The network's first line, connecting Bến Thành Market and Suối Tiên Park in Thu Duc City, was originally scheduled for completion in 2014. A groundbreaking ceremony for Line 1 was held on 21 February 2008. However, due to funding issues, construction only began in 2012, pushing the project completion date to 2018. Line 1 is mainly funded through official development assistance provided by the Japan International Cooperation Agency (JICA), with the remainder being financed by the city's government budget.

In September 2013, an agreement was reached with the Asian Development Bank, the European Investment Bank, and the Spanish Government to provide €850 million to finance the construction of Line 5, with any additional cost funded by the Vietnamese Government. A revised construction start of 2015 was provided.

On 13 September 2017, the authorities announced that Line 1 will be delayed for two years. Cost overrun, audits, and delayed payments to contractors contributed to the delay. The targeted completion date was set at 2020. Planners expect the route to serve more than 160,000 passengers daily upon launch, increasing to 635,000 by 2030 and 800,000 by 2040. All stations along the route are expected to accommodate the disabled, with automatic ticket vending machines, telephone booths, restrooms, subway doors and information bulletins accessible to the handicapped and visually impaired.

On 28 January 2019, MAUR Director of Project Management Unit Duong Huu Hoa stated that as of December 2018, construction progress of Line 1 has reached 62%, below the target of 65%. The project has been criticised by the local press for its repeated delays.

Construction of Line 2 was initially scheduled to begin in 2013, with operations beginning in 2018. However, on 13 September 2017, the local authorities have requested to the Prime Minister to push back the construction of the second line to 2020 with completion in 2024. In February 2020, the expected opening date for the first line was scheduled for the end of 2021.  No reason was given for the delay. The estimated cost of the line has also ballooned from $1.3 billion to more than $2.1 billion. 

In December 2020, it was reported that one of the Elastomeric Laminated Bearing pads, which hold up the concrete beams of the viaducts for Line 1, had fallen off, causing one of the beams to be displaced and crack. Research on the incident is still being done by the contractor.

In February 2021, first metro line completion line was pushed back to 2022.

On 8 September 2021, the Management Authority for Urban Railways (MAUR) announced that Line 1 will be further delayed. Construction is now expected to be completed in late 2023, with commercial operations beginning in 2024.

Lines 

The plan also includes 3 lines of tramway and monorail:

See also 

 Transport in Vietnam
 Hanoi Metro

Footnotes

Notes and references 
References

Bibliography

External links

 Management Authority for Urban Railways
 An updated map of the future Saigon Metro
 Ho Chi Minh at UrbanRail.net

Metro
Metro
Rapid transit in Vietnam
Underground rapid transit in Vietnam
Proposed public transport in Asia